Didier Six (born 21 August 1954) is a French football coach and former player, who most recently worked as manager of the Guinea national football team until October 2021.

A gifted but inconsistent winger, Six enjoyed a nomadic career, playing in five countries. He also played for France in the 1978 and 1982 FIFA World Cups, and was also part of the winning team at Euro 84.

Playing career
Six began his playing career at Division 2 side Valenciennes, making his debut at the age of 17 in 1972. He helped Les Athéniens achieve promotion to the top flight in 1975, which was followed by a remarkable season in which they finished 10th, and Six finished as the top scorer at the club with 12 goals. 

After turning down offers from Ajax, Borussia Dortmund and Feyenoord, Six decided to join RC Lens in 1977, where he spent a single season, notably scoring a hattrick against Lazio in the UEFA Cup. Lens were relegated at the end of 1977-78 and Six would be made the scapegoat. This was followed by two more disappointing years playing for Olympique Marseille, after which his career would become nomadic in the years that followed, playing in Belgium, Germany, England and Turkey. 

He acquired Turkish citizenship in order to play as a domestic player at Galatasaray, playing under the name Dündar Siz. There he won the Turkish First League championship in 1987–88 season.

He ended his career in 1992 after a two-year spell in the newly re-unified 2.Bundesliga with VfB Leipzig.

International career 
Six was first selected for the France national football team by manager Michel Hidalgo whilst still at Valenciennes, making his debut on March 27, 1976 against Czechoslovakia, the same game in which Michel Platini made his debut. 

He played as a winger and he earned 52 caps and scored 13 goals for the France national football team. He played in the 1978 FIFA World Cup and the 1982 FIFA World Cup, and was also part of the winning team at Euro 84.

Coaching career
Six was signed by the Togolese Football Federation as coach for the Togo national football team in November 2011.

He became manager of Mauritius in January 2015 and was fired in May 2015 following a suspension for poor behaviour during the 2015 COSAFA Cup.

In April 2018 he was one of 77 applicants for the vacant Cameroon national team job.

He became manager of Guinea on 13 September 2019, but left this role in October 2021.

References

External links
 FR Profile, stats and pictures of Didier Six
 Profile on French federation official site 

1954 births
Living people
Footballers from Lille
French footballers
France international footballers
Valenciennes FC players
RC Lens players
Olympique de Marseille players
Cercle Brugge K.S.V. players
RC Strasbourg Alsace players
VfB Stuttgart players
FC Mulhouse players
Aston Villa F.C. players
ASPV Strasbourg managers
FC Metz players
Galatasaray S.K. footballers
1. FC Lokomotive Leipzig players
Ligue 1 players
Ligue 2 players
ASPV Strasbourg players
Bundesliga players
English Football League players
Süper Lig players
1978 FIFA World Cup players
1982 FIFA World Cup players
UEFA Euro 1984 players
UEFA European Championship-winning players
Belgian Pro League players
French expatriate footballers
French expatriate sportspeople in England
French expatriate sportspeople in Belgium
French expatriate sportspeople in Germany
French expatriate sportspeople in Togo
French expatriate sportspeople in Guinea
French expatriate sportspeople in Mauritius
Expatriate footballers in Belgium
Expatriate footballers in East Germany
Expatriate footballers in Germany
Expatriate footballers in England
Expatriate footballers in Turkey
French emigrants to Turkey
Naturalized citizens of Turkey
Expatriate footballers in West Germany
Expatriate football managers in Guinea
Expatriate football managers in Togo
Expatriate football managers in Mauritius
Togo national football team managers
2013 Africa Cup of Nations managers
Association football midfielders
Guinea national football team managers
French football managers
RC Strasbourg Alsace non-playing staff
FCO Strasbourg Koenigshoffen 06 managers
French expatriate sportspeople in West Germany